Cheshire Correctional Institution is a Connecticut Department of Correction state prison for men located in Cheshire, New Haven County, Connecticut. The facility was built beginning in 1910, partly by the inmates of the Wethersfield State Prison, and opened in 1913 as the Chester Reformatory for male youths ages 16 to 24.  In 1982, the state's Manson Youth Institution opened adjacent to the Cheshire Correctional Institution, which was re-designated as an adult prison.

The current capacity of Cheshire Correctional Institution is 1580 inmates.

Notable inmates
 Earl Bradley – rapist of children, worst pedophile in American history at time of conviction, moved from Vaughn Correctional Center in Delaware as part of an interstate agreement.
 Raymond J. Clark III – convicted for the murder of Annie Le. Due to be released on September 16, 2053.
 William Devin Howell – serial killer.

References

Prisons in Connecticut
Buildings and structures in New Haven County, Connecticut
1913 establishments in Connecticut
Cheshire, Connecticut